No. 504 (County of Nottingham) Squadron was one of the Special Reserve Squadrons of the Auxiliary Air Force, and today is a reserve force of the RAF Regiment. It was integrated into the AAF proper in 1936. Based at RAF Cottesmore, Rutland, 504 Squadron used a variety of light bombers before being re-tasked to fighters with the Hawker Hurricane in 1939. It subsequently became a Fighter Squadron. Currently No. 504 Squadron no longer has a flying role, but as part of No 85 Expeditionary Logistics Wing of the RAF A4 Force.

History

Formation and early years
No. 504 squadron was formed on 26 March 1928 at RAF Hucknall, Nottinghamshire as a Special Reserve Squadron in the day bomber role. As such it flew first with Hawker Horsleys, later with Westland Wallaces and Hawker Hinds. In the meantime, on 18 May 1936, the squadron had gone over to the Auxiliary Air Force and the next change for the squadron came on 31 October 1938, when it was transferred from RAF Bomber Command to RAF Fighter Command. After a short spell with Gloster Gauntlet biplane fighters the squadron received its first really modern aircraft as their next aircraft were to be Hawker Hurricane fighters.

In World War II

On 26 August 1939 the squadron was mobilised for active service as part of RAF Fighter Command and the Squadron was transferred to RAF Digby. In 1940 Squadron Leader ”Johnnie” Hill took command whilst the squadron was at Lille, France. When the airfield was overrun Hill had taken 12 Hurricanes into the air. Hill was shot down and shot at first by French peasants, and later by a British Army major who believed him to be a fifth columnist. On recovering from his injuries Hill was given command of 222 Squadron.

Throughout the Second World War, 504 Sqn operated from over some thirty airfields in both the UK and abroad. Roles were as diverse as Heavy Bomber escort; interdiction raids across occupied France; escort duties over Arnhem during Operation Market Garden and major involvement in the Battle of Britain. In March 1945 the Squadron was re-equipped with Gloster Meteor jets, but the war in Europe ended before they saw any action. It was re-numbered No. 245 Squadron on 10 August 1945.

Into the jet age
The Squadron was reformed at RAF Syerston on 10 May 1946 as a light bomber squadron. It was initially equipped with Mosquito T.3 training aircraft but in April 1947 it was re-designated a night fighter unit, receiving Mosquito NF.30s. Its role was changed once more again in May 1948, now to that of a day fighter unit. For this it received Spitfire F.22s, flying these until October 1949, when Meteor F.4s began to arrive to replace them. These were in their turn replaced by Meteor F.8s in March 1952. The squadron standard was presented on 3 March 1957 by Air Chief Marshal Sir Francis Fogarty, GBE, KCB, DFC, AFC and then laid up in St Mary's Church, Wymeswold, RAF Wymeswold having been the Squadron's last operational base. Seven days later the squadron, along with all other 19 flying units of the since 1947 Royal Auxiliary Air Force, disbanded.

Notable squadron members
Flight Lieutenant W.B. Royce of 504 Squadron became the first AAF pilot to be awarded the DFC, Sergeant Ray Holmes of 504 Squadron was forced to ram a Dornier bomber intent on attacking Buckingham Palace when his guns jammed during the attack. This event was immortalised in the film Battle of Britain. Famous rugby player and Russian prince Alexander Obolensky flew with 504 Squadron, dying in accident on 29 March 1940. It had many international pilots too, including Emile Jayawardena from Ceylon.  Sergeant Pilot, later Squadron Leader, C. 'Wag' Haw, flew with 504 during the Battle of Britain before moving to 81 Sqn for deployment to Russia in August 1941 where he was awarded the Order of Lenin.

Current role
On 1 January 1998, the Offensive Support Role Support Squadron (OSRSS) was formed at RAF Cottesmore. This was then renamed 504 Squadron on 1 October 1999. On 1 October 2000 the reformation was celebrated with a march past in Nottingham.
Although 504 Squadron no longer had a flying role, it remained an important part of the RAF. 
As part of an Operational Support Squadron (OSS), the first role of 504 Squadron was Force Protection (FP). To this end, approximately 60% of the personnel were RAF Regiment gunners providing ground defence for all assets on deployed operations. The remaining personnel were responsible for the many other duties including: Chemical, Biological, Radiological and Nuclear (CBRN) warning and reporting, airbase shelter marshalling and general sentry duties. Elements of the squadron deployed operationally to Afghanistan in these roles. During 2014, the squadron re-roled from FP to Logistics.  As part of the RAF's No. 85 Expeditionary Logistics Wing (85 ELW) the Squadron is now based at RAF Wittering in Cambridgeshire and is recruiting personnel to train as Chefs, Drivers and Suppliers in support of deployed RAF units worldwide.

Aircraft operated

Commanding officers

See also
 List of Royal Air Force aircraft squadrons

References

Notes

Bibliography

External links

 Webpage of present 504 Squadron at RAF website
 Aviation art depicting Sgt.Ray Holmes of No.504 Squadron in combat in 1940.
 504 Squadron RAuxAF website
 Squadron histories for Nos. 500–520 sqn at rafweb
 Nos. 500–510 Squadron Aircraft & Markings

Fighter squadrons of the Royal Air Force in World War II
RAF squadrons involved in the Battle of Britain
504 Squadron
Military units and formations established in 1928
Military history of Nottinghamshire